A wine cocktail is a mixed drink, similar to a true cocktail. It is made predominantly with wine (including Champagne and Prosecco), into which distilled alcohol or other drink mixer is combined. A spritz is a drink that has Prosecco added to it.

The distinction between a wine cocktail and a cocktail with wine is the relative amounts of the various alcohols. In a wine cocktail, the wine product is the primary alcohol by volume compared to the distilled alcohol or mixer.

List of wine cocktails

Wine variation cocktails
The following drinks are not technically cocktails unless wine is secondary by volume to a distilled beverage, since wine is a fermented beverage not a distilled one.

 Agua de Valencia
 Black Velvet
 Death in the Afternoon
 Flirtini
 Prince of Wales
 Sangria
 Mulled wine (Glögg)
 Wine cooler
 One-Balled Dictator — 5 parts German Liebfraumilch, 1 part French Champagne, briefly but violently shaken, then poured into a rocks glass containing one candy cinnamon ball. This produces a very white drink, to which much symbolism was applied by British WWII veterans as related in the lyrics of a crude song "Hitler Has Only Got One Ball"

Sparkling wine cocktails
 Bellini
 Hugo

Champagne cocktails

 Buck's Fizz
 Mimosa
 Kir Royal
 Ruby Dutchess
 Chicago Cocktail
 French 75
 Golden Doublet
 Savoy Affair

Red wine cocktails
 Kalimotxo or Calimocho or Rioja Libre
 Tinto de Verano
 Zurracapote

Port cocktails
 Cheeky Vimto

White wine cocktails
 Kir 
 Spritzer
 Rocky Mountain Railway — 1 part tomato juice, 1 part lemon soft drink, 1 part white wine

See also

 List of cocktails
 Drinkware
 Port wine

External links
 "Champagne Cocktail Recipes" – over 70 recipes including photos and descriptions.

 Wine cocktails
Wine